National Highway 3 (NR3) is one of the most important highways of central-eastern Burma. It connects Mandalay to Muse on the border with China.

The highway is fed by the National Highway 1 at Mandalay at  coming from the south and 26th Street from the west. It initially goes in an easterly direction until it reaches the northeast suburb of Mandalay and then skirts the city outskirts by changing direction to the south. After moving in a southeasterly direction for several kilometres (a few miles) it then moves towards the northeast for most of its passage.

Roads in Myanmar